The red spiny rat (Maxomys surifer) is a rodent species in the family Muridae that inhabits forests in Myanmar, Thailand, Malaysia, Cambodia, Laos, Vietnam and on Java, Borneo and Sumatra islands. In China, it has been recorded only in Yunnan province.

References

Rats of Asia
Maxomys
Rodents of Cambodia
Rodents of Indonesia
Rodents of Laos
Rodents of Malaysia
Rodents of Myanmar
Rodents of Thailand
Rodents of Singapore
Rodents of Vietnam
Mammals described in 1900
Taxonomy articles created by Polbot